The 2011 European Cup was an international baseball competition among the top teams of the professional baseball leagues in Europe, held in Italy and the Netherlands from June 1 to June 5, 2011.

Amsterdam

Standings

Schedule and results

Parma

Standings

Schedule and results

References

External links
 Schedule in Amsterdam
 Schedule in Parma

European Cup
2011
2011
European Cup (baseball)